Polyptychus orthographus is a moth of the family Sphingidae. It is known from lowland forests from Sierra Leone to the Congo, Angola and Uganda.

The length of the forewings is 33–36 mm. It is very similar to Polyptychus trisectus but smaller, much paler (more ochreous) and the apex of the forewing is acute, but not produced.

References

Polyptychus
Moths described in 1903
Moths of Africa
Insects of the Democratic Republic of the Congo
Insects of West Africa
Insects of Uganda
Insects of Angola
Fauna of the Central African Republic
Fauna of Gabon